Howard Russell Smith (August 15, 1914 – September 7, 2014) was an American business executive who was president of the sticker manufacturer Avery Dennison from 1956 to 1975. He remained involved with the company as chair of its board of trustees and later its executive committee until his retirement in 1995.

Early life
Smith was born on August 15, 1914. He attended Pomona College in Claremont, California, where he later served as a trustee.

References

American business executives
1914 births
2014 deaths
American centenarians
Men centenarians
People from Ohio
People from Whittier, California
Pomona College alumni
Pomona College trustees